Mohammad Ali Taraghijah (1943 – August 12, 2010) was an Iranian painter, his work often featured rural, Iranian, landscape imagery.

Biography 
Born 1943 in Tehran, Iran. He graduated from the College of Science & Technology with a degree in Mechanical Engineering, yet his heart was set on creating art. He participated in the Iran National Art Competition in 1968 and he won the Golden Award that year. In 1970 he returned to Tehran and decided to take up painting professionally.

In 1994, the Tehran Museum of Contemporary Art selected some of his works for the museum collection and printed a collection of these works. In 1998, UNICEF selected two of his paintings for their Christmas cards.

His beautiful works have been exhibited in Switzerland, Germany, Italy, France, United States and Japan. His paintings were selected by the International Museum of 20th Century Arts to present Iran’s art.

His son, Ali Taraghijah is also a contemporary painter and his elder son, Mohammad Taraghijah is an architect.

Exhibitions
 2010, 2009, 2008, 2007, 2006, 2005, 2004, 2003, 2002, 2001, 2000, 1999, 1998, 1996 Galerie Arcade Chausse-Coqs, Genève, Switzerland.
 2009 Christie's Auction, Dubai, UEA (International Modern and Contemporary Art)
 2009 The First Fadjr International Visual Arts Festival.
 2008 Christie's Auction, Dubai, UEA (International Modern and Contemporary Art)
 2008 Bonhams auction Royal Mirage Hotel Dubai (Modern and Contemporary Arab, Iranian, Indian, and Pakistani Art)
 2008 The 7th National Biennial of Iranian Contemporary Painting Saba cultural Center
 2007 Christie's Auction, Dubai, UEA (International Modern and Contemporary Art)
 2007 The First Iranian Biennial of Printmaking, Tehran Museum of Contemporary Art
 2007 Persian spring's exhibition Tehran Museum of Contemporary Art.
 2006-2004-2002-2000 the International Painting Biennial of the Islamic World (Tehran Museum of Contemporary Art)
 2006 International visual Arts Festival of Resistance, Tehran Museum of Contemporary Art
 2006 Gallery Artefiz, Zurich, Switzerland
 2006 Beijing International Art Expo 2006, China
 2005 Museu da Agua, Lisbon Portugal + Palácio da Bolsa Porto Portugal
 2005 X-Cathédrale Sacré Coeur, Casablanca, Morocco
 2005 Modern Art Movement, Tehran Museum of Contemporary Art
 2004 Capua, Chiosto di San Domenico, Italy.
 2004 Villa Dutoite, Genève, Switzerland.
 2003 Museum of Art & Science, Daytona Beach, Florida, U.S.
 2003 Al Bidda Gallery, Doha, Qatar.
 2003 Art Museum of Southeast Texas, U.S.
 2003 Spiritual Vision Exhibition, Tehran Museum of Contemporary Art
 2003,2000,1997,1995,1993,1991 Iranian Painting Biennial, Tehran Museum of Contemporary Art
 2002 Los Angeles (Central) Public Library, U.S.
 2002 Christie's, London, U.K.
 2001 Meredian International Center, Washington D.C., U.S.
 2001 Sharjeh Art Biennial, U.A.E.
 2001 Queens Library Gallery, New York, U.S.
 2001 United Nation, Genève, Switzerland
 2001 Barbican Art Galleries, London, U.K.
 2001 Galerie Amber, Leiden, Netherlands
 2000 Gallery Azteca, Madrid, Spain
 2000 The International Contemporary Arts Center, Riyadh, Saudi Arabia
 2000 Symbolic Expression in Iranian Modernist Painting, Tehran Museum of Contemporary Art
 2000 Art Expo New York, New York, U.S.
 2000 International Trade Center, Washington DC.
 2000 1st. Drawing Biennial, Tehran Museum of Contemporary Art
 1999 Islamic Cultural Centre, London, U.K.
 1998 Art Triennal of India, Delhi, India
 1998 Expo 98 Lisbon, Portugal
 1997 China Art Expo 97, Beijing, China
 1997 Maison de l'Iran, Paris, France
 1997,1993,1990 Rathaus Pavillon Pforzheim, Germany
 1996 Feria Internacional de Arte, Mexico City, Mexico
 1995 27e Festival International de Peinture, Canges-sur-Mer, France
 1995 Galerie Reindle, Innsbruck, Austria
 1994 Fortezza de Basso, Florance, Italy
 1994,1988 Galerie Galeothek, Innsbruck, Austria
 1993,1991 Gallery Seyhoon, Tehran, Iran
 1992 Galerie Art & Decor, Wien, Austria
 1992,1989,1988,1986, 1986 Tehran Museum of Contemporary Art, Iran
 1991,1989 Galerie im Ried, Zürich, Switzerland
 1988 Galerie Modus-Vivendi, Zürich, Switzerland
 1988 Gallery Taichi, Tokyo, Japan
 1986 Galerie 8, Yverdon, Switzerland
 1986 Galerie d'Art du vieux Montreux, Switzerland
 1986, 1984 Galerie 8, Yverdon, Switzerland
 1985 Corsh Gallery, Chicago, U.S.
 1985 Galerie Milton, Yverdon, Switzerland
 1983 Solo show Tehran Museum of Contemporary Art
 1984 Galerie Shaller, Stuttgart, Germany
 1983 2nd Asian Art Bienniale, Bangladesh
 1983 Galerie Migros, St.-Croix, Switzerland
 1978 Art 9'78, The International Art Fair Basel, Basel, Switzerland
 1976 Tehran Gallery, Tehran, Iran
 1974 First Tehran International Art Expo Iran
 1967 Winner of the Gold medal in the Art Competition of the Universities in Iran

See also
 Islamic art
 Iranian art
 Islamic calligraphy
 List of Iranian artists

References

External links
 Taraghijah's official site
 M.A. Taraghijah, TIMOTCA (The International Model Of Timeless Cultural Achievements)

Iranian painters
1943 births
2010 deaths